Feathers in the Wind is a 2004 South Korean film directed by Song Il-gon. It was originally planned as a 30-minute section of a three-part omnibus film with two other directors, entitled 1.3.6. At 73 minutes, the film exceeded the limits of the original omnibus format and was released on its own theatrically and on DVD.

Synopsis
A film director comes to a small island near Jeju-do where he had agreed to meet his first love 10 years before. The woman had gone to university in Germany after the promise was made, and married a German conductor. Not entirely expecting to meet her, he comes to the island to work on his second screenplay. While on the island, he develops a friendly relationship with a young woman who runs an inn with her uncle, who has not spoken since his wife mysteriously left. On the appointed day, a piano arrives with news from the director's first love.

Cast 
 Jang Hyun-sung
 Lee So-yeon
 Kim Dae-ryeong
 Jo Sung-ha

Notes

Bibliography
 
 
 
 

2004 films
2000s Korean-language films
South Korean romantic drama films
2000s South Korean films